The 51st New York Infantry Regiment (or Shepard Rifles) was an infantry regiment in the Union Army during the American Civil War.

Service
The 51st New York Infantry was organized at New York City, New York beginning July 27, 1861 and mustered in for a three-year enlistment on October 23, 1861 under the command of Colonel Edward Ferrero.

The regiment was attached to Reno's 2nd Brigade, Burnside's North Carolina Expeditionary Corps, to April 1862. 2nd Brigade, 2nd Division, Department of North Carolina, to July 1862. 2nd Brigade, 2nd Division, IX Corps, Army of the Potomac, to April 1863. Army of the Ohio to June 1863. Army of the Tennessee to August 1863. Army of the Ohio, to September 1863. District of North Central Kentucky, 1st Division, XXIII Corps, Army of the Ohio, to February 1864. 2nd Brigade, 2nd Division, IX Corps, Army of the Potomac, to April 1864. 1st Brigade, 2nd Division, IX Corps, Army of the Potomac, to May 26, 1864. Engineers, 2nd Division, IX Corps, to July 2, 1864. 1st Brigade, 2nd Division, IX Corps, to July 1865.

The 51st New York Infantry mustered out of service on July 25, 1865.

Detailed service
Left State for Annapolis, Md., October 29. Duty at Annapolis, Md., until January 6, 1862. Burnside's Expedition to Hatteras Inlet and Roanoke, Island, N.C., January 6-February 7, 1862. Battle of Roanoke Island February 8. Duty at Roanoke Island until March 11. Movement to New Bern, N.C., March 11–13. Battle of New Bern March 14. Expedition to Elizabeth City April 17–19. Duty at New Bern until July. Moved to Newport News, Va., July 6–9, then to Fredericksburg August 2–4. Marched to the relief of Pope, August 12–15. Pope's Campaign in northern Virginia August 16-September 2. Kelly's Ford August 21. Sulphur Springs August 23–24. Plains of Manassas August 27–29. Battle of Groveton August 29. Second Battle of Bull Run August 30. Chantilly September 1. Maryland Campaign September 6–22. Battle of Frederick City September 12. Battle of South Mountain September 14. Battle of Antietam September 16–17. At Pleasant Valley until October 27. Marched to Falmouth, Va., October 27-November 17. Jefferson November 11. Sulphur Springs November 13. Warrenton November 15. Battle of Fredericksburg December 12–15. "Mud March" January 20–24, 1863. Moved to Newport News, Va., February 19, then to Covington and Paris, Ky., March 26-April 1. Moved to Mt. Sterling, Ky., April 3, to Lancaster May 6–7, and to Crab Orchard May 23. Movement to Vicksburg, Miss., June 3–17. Siege of Vicksburg June 17-July 4. Advance on Jackson, Miss., July 5–10. Siege of Jackson July 10–17. Destruction of railroad at Madison Station July 19–22. At Milldale until August 6. Moved to Cincinnati, Ohio, August 6–20, then to Nicholasville, Ky. Provost duty in District of Kentucky, Department of the Ohio, to February 1864. Veterans on furlough March–April. Moved to Annapolis, Md., and rejoined corps. Campaign from the Rapidan to the James May 3-June 15. Battle of the Wilderness May 5–7. Spotsylvania May 8–12. Po River May 10. Ny River May 12. Spotsylvania Court House May 12–21. Assault on the Salient May 22. North Anna River May 23–26. On line of the Pamunkey May 26–28. Totopotomoy May 28–31. Cold Harbor June 1–12. Bethesda Church June 1–3. Before Petersburg June 16–18. Siege of Petersburg June 16, 1864 to April 2, 1865. Mine Explosion, Petersburg, July 30, 1864. Weldon Railroad August 18–21. Poplar Grove Church, Peeble's Farm September 29-October 2. Boydton Plank Road, Hatcher's Run, October 27–28. Fort Stedman, Petersburg, March 25, 1865. Appomattox Campaign March 28-April 9. Assault on and fall of Petersburg April 2. Pursuit of Lee to Farmville April 3–9. Moved to Petersburg, then to City Point and Washington, D.C., April 20–28. Grand Review of the Armies May 23. Duty at Washington, D.C., and Alexandria, Va., until July.

Casualties
The regiment lost a total of 378 men during service; 9 officers and 193 enlisted men killed or mortally wounded, 2 officers and 174 enlisted men died of disease.

Commanders
 Colonel Edward Ferrero
 Colonel Robert Brown Potter
 Colonel Charles Le Gendre
 Colonel Gilbert McKibben
 Colonel John Gibson Wright

Notable members
 Sergeant Orlando E. Caruana, Company K - Medal of Honor recipient for actions at the Battle of New Bern and the Battle of South Mountain

 Major Geroge W. Whitman - brother of poet Walt Whitman

See also

 List of New York Civil War regiments
 New York in the Civil War

References
 Dyer, Frederick H. A Compendium of the War of the Rebellion (Des Moines, IA:  Dyer Pub. Co.), 1908.
 Memoirs of the late Adjt. Andrew L. Fowler, of the 51st N.Y.V., Who Fell at the Battle of Antietam Bridge, September 17th, 1862 (New York: Ferris & Pratt, Book and Job Printers), 1863.
 Quarter-Century Banquet of the 51st Regiment N.Y. Volunteers (Shepard Rifles), 29th October, 1886 (New York: Veteran Association), 1886.
 Whitman, George Washington. Civil War Letters of George Washington Whitman (Durham, NC: Duke University Press), 1975. 
Attribution

External links
 Regimental color of the 51st New York Veteran Volunteer Infantry
 Guidons of the 51st New York Veteran Volunteer Infantry
 51st New York Infantry monument at Antietam Battlefield

Military units and formations established in 1861
1861 establishments in New York (state)
Military units and formations disestablished in 1865
Infantry 051